Sambégou Bangoura (born 3 April 1982) is a Guinean former footballer who played as a striker.

Career
Bangoura started his footballing career in Belgium with Lokeren and then Standard Liège before leaving to play in The Championship with Stoke City. transferred for £900,000 in August 2005, a club record fee at that time. He began the 2005–06 season well scoring eight goals in ten matches but was hampered after he failed to return to the club after playing in the Africa Cup of Nations.

In June 2006, he did not return to pre-season training for the 2006–07 season and a club statement confirmed that Bangoura would be fined on his eventual return. On 4 August 2006, one day before club's first game against Southend United, he returned to The Potters. He claimed the reason for his late arrival was that he could not get a passport for his young daughter, who had to remain in Guinea. Bangoura was handed his first start of the season against Burnley, however he lasted only 43 minutes before limping off due to injury. He failed to cement a starting place, and speculations for a loan or permanent move arose.

Bangoura joined FC Brussels on a 6-month loan on 11 January 2007, in the hope to get first team action. The personal problems he had experienced in England continued in Belgium. On 13 August 2007, Bangoura signed for Portuguese club Boavista F.C. for a fee of £270,000. He would not last long, as he joined Spain's Cádiz CF on loan, during the January transfer window. He then joined Greek side Panserraikos in 2009 where he stayed until March 2013.

In April 2013, he joined AS Kaloum Star.

International career
He was part of the Guinean 2004 African Nations Cup team, who finished second in their group in the first round of competition, before losing 2–1 in the quarter finals to Mali. Bangoura played again in the 2006 African Nations Cup, with a prominent role in the country's three group wins before the team was knocked out in the quarter finals by Senegal in a match which ended 3–2. He failed to turn up at Stoke City after the tournament, as he stayed in Guinea due to family problems.

Career statistics

Club
Sources:

International
Source:

References

External links
 
 Profile and stats - Lokeren

1982 births
Living people
Guinean footballers
Guinean expatriate footballers
Guinea international footballers
2004 African Cup of Nations players
2006 Africa Cup of Nations players
K.S.C. Lokeren Oost-Vlaanderen players
Standard Liège players
Stoke City F.C. players
R.W.D.M. Brussels F.C. players
Boavista F.C. players
Cádiz CF players
Panserraikos F.C. players
AS Kaloum Star players
Belgian Pro League players
English Football League players
Primeira Liga players
Super League Greece players
Expatriate footballers in Belgium
Expatriate footballers in England
Expatriate footballers in Portugal
Expatriate footballers in Spain
Expatriate footballers in Greece
Association football forwards
Guinée Championnat National players